The 2026 Saxony-Anhalt state election will be held in 2026 to elect the 9th Landtag of Saxony-Anhalt.

Opinion polls

References

See also 

21st century in Saxony-Anhalt
2026 elections in Germany
Elections in Saxony-Anhalt